Daniel Brink Park is a suburb of Johannesburg, South Africa, in Region B of the City of Johannesburg Metropolitan Municipality.

References

Johannesburg Region B